Jeannie is an American animated television series that originally aired for a 16-episode season on CBS from September 8 to December 22, 1973. It was produced by Hanna-Barbera in association with Screen Gems, and its founders William Hanna and Joseph Barbera are the executive producers. Despite being a spin-off of sorts of the television sitcom I Dream of Jeannie, Jeannie has little in common with its parent show. In this version, the title character is rescued on the beaches of southern California by a high school student, Corey Anders. Jeannie is accompanied by genie-in-training Babu, and they become companions to Corey and his best friend, Henry Glopp, both of whom also help Jeannie and Babu adjust to their new home as well as life in Los Angeles. The series was marketed towards a younger demographic than I Dream of Jeannie.

Julie McWhirter replaces Barbara Eden in the lead role. In his first voice-acting job, Mark Hamill plays Corey Anders, and also sings the theme music. Babu is voiced by Joe Besser, who had a successful voice-acting career at the time. Jeannie was shown as part of CBS's Saturday-morning cartoon programming block, and episodes aired between 1973 and 1975. The show was also included on the wheel series Fred Flintstone and Friends, and had crossovers with the Scooby-Doo franchise. Though a few retrospective reviews of Jeannie have been negative, it has gained popularity after Warner Bros. bought Hanna-Barbera and its properties in 1996, and it remains popular with the public and industry professionals, and has been recently distributed via two streaming services: Crackle and CTV Throwback. An episode can also be viewed at the UCLA Film & Television Archive.

Premise and characters
In Jeannie, high school student Corey Anders discovers Jeannie's bottle while surfing and draws the title character out of it. Corey becomes the master to Jeannie and her apprentice Babu. Portrayed as a 16-year-old, Jeannie is shown as training the "junior genie" Babu, who frequently causes trouble due to his inexperience with magic. Playing the role of the comic relief, Babu is characterized as having a habit of "popping in at the most inopportune times". The pair become close "friends and protectors" to Corey, who is Jeannie's love interest.

Episodes typically focus on Corey's attempts to hide Jeannie and Babu's true identities as he attends Center City High School and Jeannie's difficulties with adjusting to life in 1970s California. Corey's storylines also include his friend Henry Glopp; other than Corey, Henry is the only other person aware of Jeannie's identity as a genie. Other supporting characters include Corey's mom (Mrs. Anders), a friend and an antagonist (S. Melvin Farthinggale), the Master of all Genies (Great Hadji), and Debbie. S. Melvin is portrayed as a "snobbish snoop", who frequently sneaks around the Anders' home due to his suspicions about Jeannie and Babu.

Jeannie is an animated spin-off of the live-action television sitcom I Dream of Jeannie, although it has a substantially different plot than its parent show. In this version, Corey replaces astronaut Major Tony Nelson. While I Dream of Jeannie was a family show, it focused on '60s-style relationships (especially in its first season), the NASA moon project and broad slapstick. The humor used for the animated Jeannie, more focused toward teenagers and children, is of the "Archie" comics nature, with themes of dating, school events and friendship. Like the original series, Jeannie is emotionally attached to her assumed boyfriend and becomes jealous in the face of competition, a staple of teen-age comics and sitcoms. Unlike the original series, Jeannie is depicted as younger and with red hair instead of blonde; she activates her magic by shaking her ponytail rather than blinking her eyes.

Production

Jeannie was a Hanna-Barbera production, with the company's founders William Hanna and Joseph Barbera serving as the show's executive producers. Charles August Nichols was the director, and Iwao Takamoto was the producer. I Dream of Jeannie creator Sidney Sheldon is not included in the credits for Jeannie, which The A.V. Clubs Will Harris attributes to the extreme differences between the two shows. Hanna-Barbera had created Jeannie as a way to appeal to a younger demographic. The musical director was Hoyt Curtin and music supervisor was Paul DeKorte. Jeannie was a co-production between Hanna-Barbera and Columbia Pictures, as Columbia's Screen Gems television division was the owner of I Dream of Jeannie. Hanna-Barbera had a long association with Columbia and Screen Gems as they distributed their earlier shows, including The Flintstones and The Jetsons. However, the rights to all Hanna-Barbera properties were transferred to Warner Bros. after the studio purchased the company in 1996. Hanna-Barbera did not, however, animate the titles for the original I Dream of Jeannie--that was DePatie-Freleng--but they did animate a variety of opening titles (including both Darrins) for Screen Gems' Bewitched.

Barbara Eden was replaced by Julie McWhirter as the voice of Jeannie. Mark Hamill provides the voice for Corey Anders, in his first voice-acting job. Along with voicing the character, he sings the theme music. Hamill would not become well known as a voice actor until his role as the Joker in the television show Batman: The Animated Series.

Bob Hastings and Joe Besser portray Henry Glopp and Babu, respectively. Besser was a successful voice actor during the 1970s and 1980s; along with Jeannie, he also voiced regular characters in the television programs The Houndcats and Yogi's Space Race. He had previously appeared in an I Dream of Jeannie episode, alongside the members of The Three Stooges. Debbie, Mark, and Mrs. Anders are played by Arlene Golonka, Michael Bell, and Janet Waldo, respectively. John Stephenson and Tommy Cook voice Great Hadji and S. Melvin Farthinggale. Sherry Alberoni, Julie Bennett, Don Messick, and Ginny Tyler provide additional voice-acting for the series.

Episodes

Broadcast history and release 
Jeannie aired on CBS with its 16 30-minute episodes initially broadcast in 1973. CBS continued to run episodes until August 1975 as part of its Saturday-morning cartoon programming block. The episode "The Decathlon" is available for viewing at the UCLA Film & Television Archive. Jeannie was made available digitally by CTV Television Network through their streaming service CTV Throwback, as well as on Sony and Columbia's streaming service Crackle.

Jeannie was shown as part of the wheel series Fred Flintstone and Friends, which had Fred Flintstone host excerpts taken from Hanna-Barbera programs. It also had several crossovers with the Scooby-Doo franchise. Babu appears in the television show Scooby's All-Star Laff-A-Lympics, in which he participates on the "Scooby Doobies" team. Babu, Jeannie, Corey, and Henry return for The New Scooby-Doo Movies episode "Mystery in Persia", also known "Scooby-Doo Meets Jeannie". Jeannie helps to trap the genie Jadal the Evil inside a bottle and uncover that Adbullah is his master.

Notes

References

Citations

Book sources

External links
 
 Jeannie at The Big Cartoon DataBase

1973 American television series debuts
1973 American television series endings
1970s American animated television series
American children's animated adventure television series
American children's animated comedy television series
American children's animated fantasy television series
American animated television spin-offs
CBS original programming
I Dream of Jeannie
Teen animated television series
Television series by Hanna-Barbera
Television series by Sony Pictures Television
Television series by Screen Gems
Adaptations of works by Sidney Sheldon
English-language television shows